In algebraic geometry, an elliptic singularity of a surface, introduced by , is a surface singularity such that the arithmetic genus of its local ring is 1.

See also
Rational singularity

References

Algebraic surfaces
Singularity theory